Leslie Nash is a British auto racing driver. In 1973 he finished sixth overall and as champion in Class A in the British Saloon Car Championship, driving a Sunbeam Imp that had been driven the previous season by championship winner Bill McGovern.

Racing record

Complete British Saloon Car Championship results
(key) (Races in bold indicate pole position; races in italics indicate fastest lap.)

† Events with 2 races staged for the different classes.

^ Race with 2 heats - Aggregate result.

References

External links

English racing drivers
British Touring Car Championship drivers
Living people
Year of birth missing (living people)